There was a Scottish National Party leadership election to choose the new National Convener of the Scottish National Party (SNP) in 2000. The election followed the announcement by SNP Leader Alex Salmond, that he would be stepping down as SNP leader in 2000. Salmond's announcement came in the face of internal criticism after a series of high-profile fall-outs with party members. Elections were also held for the position of Depute Leader.

The election saw John Swinney become National Convener, and Roseanna Cunningham become Depute Leader.

National Convener election

Candidates
Two candidates presented themselves for election; SNP Depute Leader and spokesman on enterprise and lifelong learning, John Swinney; and the SNP vice-convener for policy and social security spokesman, Alex Neil. Swinney was simultaneously serving as both an MP and MSP, and Neil was a serving MSP.

Issues
Whilst both candidates supported the position of the SNP on the centre-left, Neil was seen as the more left-wing of the two, and individuals associated with the Neil campaign argued that a Swinney administration would drag the SNP to the right.

In someways the fight was seen as being between the SNP's Fundamentalists and gradualists. Swinney was seen as representing the SNP gradualist wing, advocating devolution as a stepping stone towards Scottish independence. Neil however was far more critical and suspicious of devolution, viewing it as a means of undermining the case for independence, and was more forceful in pushing for a party emphasis on Scottish independence. Swinney, as a gradualist, argued that independence could only follow a successful vote in a referendum, whilst Neil believed that an SNP victory would be enough to secure negotiations for independence.

Both candidates opposed trident, and were largely pro-European Union. Swinney however advocated joining the Euro at the earliest opportunity, whilst Neil believed pre-emptive joining of the Euro could undermine Scottish jobs. Swinney also favoured greater European integration on issues such as defence, whilst Neil favoured a weaker EU, and opposed the pooling of defence forces.

Results

Voting system
Each SNP branch sent delegates to the election, with larger branches sending more members. Some 700 delegates had the right to vote.

Results

Leadership
The result of the election was announced at the party conference on 23 September. John Swinney won the election by 547 votes to 268.

Depute

Treasurer

Endorsements

John Swinney 
Mike Russell
Roseanna Cunningham
Kenny MacAskill

Alex Neil 
Federation of Student Nationalists
Adam Ingram
Peter Kearney

References 

2000
2000 in British politics
2000 in Scotland
2000s elections in Scotland
2000 elections in the United Kingdom
Scottish National Party leadership election